Elephantmen is an American ongoing monthly comic book published by Image Comics and written by Richard Starkings with art by Moritat and a number of other artists. Issue #1 was released in July 2006.

Overview
Some 200 years from now, the MAPPO Corporation, headed by the misanthropic and megalomaniacal Japanese scientist Dr. Kazushi Nikken, breeds human/animal hybrids in a secure, top-secret facility somewhere in North Africa. The Hybrids are composed of numerous African animal species including warthogs, elephants, camels, zebras, rhinos, hippos, giraffes, hyenas and crocodiles. The process involves implanting embryos into the wombs of kidnapped local women who are disposed of after giving birth. Each child is branded after birth, marking them as the property of MAPPO.

These Elephantmen are trained from birth to be the perfect emotionless super soldiers and merciless killers, and are indoctrinated with an Orwellian mindset to think of themselves as property of the MAPPO Corporation and to deny any concept of free thought.

Upon discovering these experiments, the United Nations send in an army to storm MAPPO's secret base. While their mission has not been elaborated at this stage, it seems to be a combination of liberating the Elephantmen, investigating the attacks on the local populace, and ending the development of MAPPO's illegal army.

MAPPO turns the Elephantmen on the U.N. troops, and horrendous casualties are inflicted on both sides. Ultimately, the U.N. succeed in subduing the Elephantmen and the MAPPO personnel are arrested. The Elephantmen are rehabilitated and released to establish their own lives in the outside world, where they are generally treated with distrust and horror from humans. Many of the Elephantmen were assigned jobs by the government.

Living with humans has proven to be incredibly difficult for the Elephantmen. The war in which they fought had great consequences as people from both sides (Elephantmen included) lost many loved ones. Not all of those who survived retained their sanity; in fact, some became active hunters who tracked down Elephantmen and then executed them. The series shows that the characters are haunted by memories that are still raw, with some people being driven to insanity due to being unable to let go of the past. It is evident that the Elephantmen themselves show some level of regret towards what they did during the conflict. It is also evident that crimes such as the ivory trade are seen as a good excuse to commit murder, and that even the Elephantmen themselves are involved with the seedy underworld and drug abuse. Women who befriend and become romantically involved with the Elephantmen are treated as outsiders, frowned upon, yet some have nightmares about their offspring and the chances of survival during childbirth. At this time in the series, the species do not accept each other.

The series as a whole is similar to the book Do Androids Dream of Electric Sheep?. Thus it also bears similarities to the film adaptation of the aforementioned book.

Publication history
The Elephantmen series is a spin-off from the series Hip Flask, set in the same universe and expanding on details of various minor characters from that series. Elephantmen: War Toys is a three-issue mini-series prequel.

Characters

Elephantmen
 Hieronymus (Hip) Flask - Hippopotamus Hybrid Flask #7A. Hip Flask's tattoo is distorted by a scar so that "Hippopotamus Hybrid Flask #7A" instead reads just "Hip Flask #7A", hence his name. A product of the Human/Animal hybrid research of The MAPPO Corporation, Hip Flask is a walking, talking hippopotamus who works as an advisor for the Information Agency, a government body tasked with monitoring data and information as an aid to law enforcement. He is partnered by a beautiful young woman named Vanity Case who seems to have romantic feelings towards him (much to Hip's embarrassment), and befriends a cab-driver Miki to whom he slowly becomes mutually attracted. Despite some bumps along the way, Hip and Miki form a true romance, which he deeply appreciates and cherishes but it still scares him what being with him could do to Miki. Despite his traumatic childhood Hip Flask is shown to be a calm, kind and friendly individual, unlike many of the other Elephantmen who display a great deal of bitterness. Hip Flask was possibly the only Elephantman who dared to ask questions during his childhood education, an act for which he was placed in solitary confinement. It is eventually revealed that Hip is Sahara's younger half-brother because he was born from her mother.
 Ebenezer Hide - Elephant Hybrid. "Ebony" works in the Information Agency with Hip Flask. Overcome with depression, he relies heavily on drugs to relive his prime, both mentally and sexually. Possibly as a result of PTSD and the drugs he uses, Ebony has vivid waking dreams of warrior fantasies, his favorite comic being Conan the Barbarian. He lost his legs due to serious injuries and is now confined to a hovering wheelchair. 
 Tusk - Warthog Hybrid. He was driven to insanity due to MAPPO's extensive chemical experimentation to see if the Elephantmen could withstand poisons and harsh chemicals. His body did withstand it but his mind could not. After the Elephantmen were "liberated" Tusk resided at the Elephantmen hospital in downtown Santa Monica until he escaped by mistake. He wandered near some docks and came across a senile old lady, looking for her "Joe", and saved her from falling off the pier. The old woman offered him food and shelter, to Tusk's appreciation for her kindness despite his maddened mind. Unfortunately, Trench and three cops mistook Tusk for holding the woman hostage and killed him. Tusk was given a funeral service that was attended by Hip, Ebony, Miki, and Sahara. 
 Casbah Joe - Camel Hybrid. Runs a floating restaurant/nightclub called the Eye of the Needle.
 Obadiah Horn - Rhinoceros Hybrid. Horn has climbed the ranks of society and has become a successful Los Angeles businessman. He is married to Sahara. He is aggressive and almost unforgiving, but deep down a good person. Unless his wife is present, there is no other person who can reason with him. Sahara succeeds in birthing a son for Obadiah but the baby is kidnapped by Sahara's father, Serengheti. In a fit of rage, Obadiah shoots Gabbatha dead, shocking Sahara that she is reluctant to get close to him again. Obadiah is deeply ashamed for his murder of Gabbatha and his wife's reaction and he dedicates to making amends. 
 Elijah Delaney - Crocodile Hybrid. No known characteristics.
 Trench - Zebra Hybrid. He is a Lieutenant in the Los Angeles Police Department. When he fought in a war while still under MAPPO's control, Trench lost his eye to a piece of shrapnel, and he stuck a burning stick into the wound to cauterize it. His experiences and the horrors he has witnessed have caused him to see the world in black-and-white, making him appear ruthless and unfeeling in some cases he works on, and having no qualms with collateral damage in his work as a police officer. However, after Promethean's attempted coup using their Hyena Transgenics, many of which Trench killed (and enjoyed doing it) he becomes so disturbed by his enjoyment of killing that he decides to go out drinking while planning to turn in his badge the next day. He is slipped a cocktail of hallucinogenics from a woman named Lindy Lund, the twin sister of a drug-dealer Trench killed, and very nearly dies in the car-chase that ensued. In the end, Lund is arrested and Trench survives his near-death experience.
 Jeremiah Granger - Giraffe Hybrid. He is a tailor and a friend of Hip Flask, Ebony Hide, and even Sahara who visits him whenever she goes out anonymously. He is an educated and kind person, having extensive knowledge of tea and textiles, and among the few people Sahara confides in.
 Gabbatha - Elephant Hybrid. Gabbatha is an Elephantman Buddhist who advocates life, acceptance, tolerance, and forgiveness, having become quite famous for his practice and even gained a following of like-minded human individuals. He was to be the officiator of Obadiah Horn and Sahara's wedding (unaware that Sahara had left her double Panya in her place). When the real Sahara came, revealing her and Obadiah's child, she entrusted her son to Gabbatha while she and their friends dealt with her murderous father Serengheti. Panya took the baby from Gabbatha's arms and offered him to Serenghetti, only to be shot dead. In a fit of rage and grief, Obadiah impulsively shot and killed Gabbatha. His death was a tragic loss to humans and Elephantmen alike and it caused a strain in Obadiah and Sahara's relationship.
 Demetrios - Mammoth Hybrid. Demetrios is a transgenic but was not created by MAPPO. He was created by a female Russian Scientist, who was exiled for thought crimes. She stumbled upon the remains of a mammoth. She took DNA samples, implanted them with her own eggs and carried her creation in her own womb. She had to give premature birth to her child, otherwise he would have killed her had she carried him to full term. She raised and loved Demetrios and taught him survival, as well as to speak many languages. Alas, when Demetrios was near-fully grown, men came, desiring his mother's research secrets and him, so they could create an army of transgenics using his mother's work. In the conflict that followed, Demetrios' mother was killed and he alone survived. He journeyed north to avoid people but was hunted relentlessly until finally he was captured by hunters and brought back to the city by cargo ship. Demetrios managed to get loose and killed the hunters but was dealt too many wounds in turn. Miki found Demetrios and he told her his story before he died, but thanked her for her compassion.
 The Mops - Hyena Hybrids. The Mops was the nickname of the Hyena Hybrid Elephantmen MAPPO created to serve as the "cleanup crew" during the war. Their job was to kill any survivors without mercy or exception. When MAPPO was brought down, the Hyenas were deemed too savage and dangerous to be rehabilitated and were all put down. The remnants of MAPPO known as Promethean genetically engineered a new army of Hyena Elephantmen to purge the city of the older Elephantmen but Obadiah Horn and his android servant Mr. Purchase managed to detonate the explosives implanted into the Hyenas' skulls, stopping their rampage.
 The Tigers - Tiger Hybrids. The Tigers were transgenics created by China to serve in their military as their counter-forces against MAPPO's Elephantmen soldiers. They were efficient but once the war concluded, they were all simultaneously executed via remotely-detonated explosives implanted into their skulls, because China's already massive population could not afford to let them live.

Humans
 Bianca "Vanity" Case - Hip Flask's new junior-partner. She had a crush on him but after Hip and Miki became a couple, Vanity appeared to shift her infatuation to Ebony. 
 Joshua Serengheti - The main antagonist in the story. He despises the Elephantmen and wants them all killed. He is the father of Sahara and is involved with the ivory industry. He detests the Elephantmen because his job in the industry became less profitable due to the individual species of the elephantmen no longer being endangered. Essentially he hated the MAPPO corporation for somewhat saving endangered animals. Serengheti spent most of his life killing and grew up to be as cruel and ruthless as the men who had forced him to kill. He even sold the mother of his daughter to MAPPO for money, and came to despise Sahara simply for being a girl and named her after the most barren desert on the planet, subjecting her to physical and emotional abuse, as well as allowing some of his men to rape her. After she escaped him, Serengheti has been looking for her, not because he has any affection for her of any kind but rather he sees her as his property. He sought out Sahara to kill her rather than allow her to wed Obadiah Horn but instead kidnaps her son.
 Herman Strumm - Mouth Almighty Herman Strumm and his delectable sidekick, Rabbi, entertain satellite radio listeners via Dogstar Radio. He was visited by Elijah Delaney for an interview.
 Sahara - The wife of Obadiah Horn. She acts as the voice of reason to the Elephantmen, and she is seen by all as their queen, capable of reasoning with Obadiah. She is the very reason why mankind is forced to coexist with the Elephantmen. Her father, Serengheti, abused her physically and emotionally for most of her childhood (and was sexually assaulted by his men and underwent a painful African form of circumcision) until she managed to get away from him. She somehow discovered Hip Flask to be her younger half-brother since he was born from her mother. She gives birth to Obadiah Horn's son (the baby born appearing entirely human) but her child winds up getting kidnapped by her father Serengheti. She becomes distant to her husband after he impulsively murders Gabbatha in a fit of rage, but after reminiscing a moment from her childhood where her mother gave her guidance, Sahara begins mending the bond with her husband. 
 Savannah - A little girl who is interested in the Elephantmen, Ebony in particular, much to the disgust and concern of her mother. She is based on Richard Starkings' real life child, Savannah Starkings.
 Miki - She is a cab driver in Santa Monica. Totally uninhibited and possessed of a very strong sex drive, she developed a huge crush on Hip, which came to be mutual despite her mere associating with Hip causing much strife and conflict between Miki and her mother (that came to an end when Miki's mother recognized Hip as the one who spared her and her family during a war when she was younger). After discovering she was pregnant (after having been exposed to a deadly virus) she gave up the baby for research, Hip accompanying her for moral support, to her deep appreciation. Their relationship deepens into true and sincere love, this leading to Miki refusing to be dissuaded by any naysayers about her relationship with Hip, and she is able to lift Hip's spirits whenever he is depressed and convinces him whatever comes their way she will be with him.
 Janis Blackthorne - A former UN soldier and a member of the Los Angeles Police Department. She was kicked out by her parents when she was fifteen for unknown reasons. After spending some years as a drug dealer, she got herself cleaned up and became a UN soldier. During that time she meet and married a man called James, eventually they fought in the war against the Elephantmen and during a battle James was killed. Blaming herself for his death Janis developed a hatred towards the Elephantmen, however she often worked alongside Hip and Ebony on several occasions and even gain respect for them. She was later killed by Yvette after preventing her from killing Granger. 
 Panya - Panya is an employee of Joe, working as a dancer in the Eye of the Needle, where she was spotted by Sahara and Obadiah Horn. Noting how they looked so much alike, Sahara approached Panya and hired her to switches places with her every now and then so that Sahara could interact with the public anonymously while Panya distracts the world that is constantly watching Sahara, including Obadiah Horn. Panya soon grows to like being Sahara that she even tries to take her place permanently. In the end, she is murdered by Serengheti. However, Panya managed to arrange for her mother to be provided for by sending a White-Gold Elephant statuette to Vlasco and a letter telling him if he'd ever had a heart he'd sell the Elephant and give the money to her mother, as well as some parting words. 
 Yvette - Yvette was a soldier who fought the Elephantmen when they were MAPPO's soldiers. She earned a bloody reputation of carving her name onto the heads of every Elephantman she killed, driven by her hatred of them for killing her family and taking everything she had from her, causing her to swear to kill every last Elephantman. She resurfaced years after the war in France and became a serial killer, hunting and killing all Elephantmen she could find regardless of who they were, and writing the words 'No Mercy' on walls or their bodies with their blood, all the while wearing the skull of Tusk. Her killing spree comes to an end after she fails to kill Obadiah Horn. In the confrontation, Sahara tries to talk Yvette into letting go of her hatred and emotional baggage, but Yvette, full of bitterness, hatred, and grief, cannot let it go and feeling there is no future for someone like her she takes her own life. 
 Dr. Nikken - Dr. Nikken of the MAPPO corporation used kidnapped women as incubators to bring to term several experimental human/animal hybrids. He originally intended them to be used as "weapons of mass destruction", despite soldiers being incapable of qualifying for the term. This is likely an oversight on the part of the comic writer. Nikken has a god complex and no morals of any kind, not having a sliver of guilt or regret of the suffering he caused and the lives he'd destroyed in his experiments.
 La Mantia - La Mantia is a government agent who oversees the Elephantmen's activities. In reality, he is a part of a conspiracy called Promethean that is composed of remnants of MAPPO who wish to rise in power again using the Elephantmen, old and new. He is intelligent, ruthless, and ambitious, as he attempted to destroy Obadiah Horn and Sahara's unborn child but instead destroyed a decoy fetus that Panya had been carrying, mistaking her for the real Sahara. He and his fellow Prometheans plan an extermination of the old Elephantmen using their recently developed Transgenic Hyena Soldiers, and he personally approaches Horn to offer him leadership of the army under the thumb of the Prometheans. He arrogantly lets his guard down, which provides Horn the perfect opportunity to kill him, and he does by crushing La Mantia's head and his corpse is fed upon by his own Hyena soldiers. 
 Agathe - Agathe was a young girl who met Yvette and was inspired to fight the Elephantment for idealistic reasons. Because of her age, Yvette did not allow her to come with her after she recovered from Agathe's mother's hospitality. Alas, the war involving the Elephantmen soon found Agathe's family and her mother and brothers were killed. She was approached by Trench who spared her life and told her to run to France. Agathe instead took up a dead soldier's gun and started killing Elephantmen herself. She was found by human resistance fighters who took her in and told her of their plan to kill the Elephantmen invading their country. An Elephantman soldier found their hideout and gunned them down, missing only Agathe who managed to remain hidden. Filled with rage, grief and emboldened by everything she lost, Agathe went forward with her allies' plan, leaving only a message intended for the creators of the Elephantmen. She swore that even if their monsters won their land would never be their prize; she insured this by using an explosive to detonate a nuclear power plant. At the cost of her own life, Agathe single-handedly caused more deaths in the war than anyone, both Elephantman and human, and her country became a radiated wasteland.
 Carlos Vlasco - Vlasco was the head of MAPPO security and once under Nikken's payroll. He took sadistic enjoyment of physically and mentally abusing all the Elephantmen MAPPO created and was allowed to in order to produce obedient and hard soldiers. When MAPPO was brought down, Vlasco was attacked by Ebony, who crushed his legs and stabbed him through the chest with his tusk. Miraculously, Vlasco survived and escaped prosecution by the aid of Joe. He used criminal connections to get medical treatment and new prosthetic legs, but was soon diagnosed with cancer. He became a hitman known as the Silencer and used advanced cloaking to become invisible. He killed many Elephantmen and harvested their cells to produce treatments for his cancer to prevent his death, and has killed hundreds of people in his career as a hitman, both Elephantmen and humans. He disposed of many of his victims' bodies by placing them in weighed body bags and dumping them into a river canal. His dumping site was eventually discovered and he became known also as the River Killer.

Collected editions
 Elephantmen, vol. 0: Armed Forces- Collects Elephantmen: War Toys #1-3 Elephantmen: Yvette, Elephantmen #34-35. Softcover:  Hardcover: 
 Elephantmen, vol. 1: Wounded Animals - Collects Elephantmen #1-7. Softcover:  Hardcover: 
 Elephantmen, vol. 2: Fatal Diseases - Collects Elephantmen #8-15 & The Pilot. Softcover:  Hardcover: 
 Elephantmen: Damaged Goods - Collects Elephantmen #18-20. Softcover: 
 Elephantmen, vol. 3: Dangerous Liaisons - Collects Elephantmen #16-23. Softcover:  Hardcover: 
 Elephantmen, vol. 4: Questionable Things - Collects Elephantmen #24-30. Softcover:  Hardcover: 
 Elephantmen, vol. 5: Devilish Functions - Collects Elephantmen #31-33 and 36-39. Softcover:  Hardcover: 
 Elephantmen, vol. 6: Earthly Desires - Collects Elephantmen #40-49. Softcover:  Hardcover: 
 Elephantmen, Mammoth Vol. 1 - Collects Elephantmen: War Toys #1-3 Elephantmen: Yvette, Elephantmen #1-11, #34-35, #57. Softcover: 
 Elephantmen, Mammoth Vol. 2 - Collects Elephantmen #12-30. Softcover: 
 Elephantmen, Mammoth Vol. 3 - Collects Elephantmen #31-50. Softcover: 
 Elephantmen: 2260 vol. 1: Memories of the Future - Collects Elephantmen #51-55. Softcover: 
 Elephantmen: 2260 vol. 2: The Red Queen - Collects Elephantmen #58-62. Softcover: 
 Elephantmen: 2260 vol. 3: Learning to be Human - Collects Elephantmen #50, 56, 57, 63 & 64. Softcover: 
 Elephantmen: 2260 vol. 4: All Coming Evil - Collects Elephantmen #65-69. Softcover: 
 Elephantmen: 2260 vol. 5: Up Close and Personal - Collects Elephantmen #70-71, 73-76. Softcover: 
 Elephantmen: 2260 vol. 6: The Least, The Lost & The Last - Collects Elephantmen #72, 77-80. Softcover: 
 Elephantmen: 2261 vol. 1: The Death of Shorty. Softcover: 
 Elephantmen: 2261 vol. 2: The Pentalion Job!. Softcover.
 Elephantmen: 2261 vol. 3: Theo Laroux Meets The Elephantmen!

Film adaptation
At WonderCon in 2010 Comicraft/Active Images said the option of their Image Comics series Elephantmen was bought by Zucker Productions for development into a film. Starkings himself was working on the draft treatment: "Jerry [Zucker] and I can't wait to bring the stories of Hip, Horn and Sahara to life on screen in a way that will simply take your breath away". The project's status is unknown.

References

External links
 
 
 
 
 comiXology.com's podcast with Richard Starkings on Elephantmen #11 and War Toys

Fictional human hybrids